George Magee Wyckoff Jr. (December 28, 1928 – January 10, 2003) was an American steel company executive and owner.  He was mayor of Cumberland, Maryland from 1982 to 1988.

Early life
Wyckoff was born in Buffalo, New York and attended Hotchkiss School and Yale University. He married Lucy Benedict Williams, who died in 1996. They had a son, George, and two daughters, Lucy and Alice. Wyckoff's parents were Wyckoff Steel executive, George M. senior, and Marjorie Annabelle. He had two sisters, Marjorie and Florence.

Career
Wyckoff began his career working for worked for his great-uncle's company, Wyckoff Steel Company, running the company's Pittsburgh, Cleveland, and Chicago offices.  Wyckoff Steel was sold in 1964, and in 1967 he bought the Cumberland Steel Company, a company that produced precision shafts for the machine tool industry, and moved to Cumberland, Maryland.  Wyckoff grew the small company into a $6 million a year business.  He sold the company's Cumberland plant 1987; the company's larger plant was in the Chicago area.

Wyckoff was a member of the Municipal Planning and Zoning Commission in Cumberland in the early 1970s. He was Vice President of the local chapter of the American Cancer Society in 1973–74. 

He served as Mayor of Cumberland from 1982 to 1990. One of his major achievements as Mayor was persuading West Virginia to require that Ridgeley, West Virginia, just upstream from Cumberland, to stop dumping raw sewage into the Potomac River.  He was remembered for his work to fluoridate water during his tenure as mayor. However, his tenure was mixed and controversial – especially his decision to raise taxes in a city that lost Kelly Springfield Tires as an employer in a closure in 1987.

Wyckoff served on the board of Cumberland Memorial Hospital and First National Bank of Maryland and as president of the Allegheny County Chamber of Congress.

Retirement years

In his retirement years as businessman and mayor. He faced several issues including a daughter who had legal and addiction issues. Upon his death in 2003 there was a police presence to arrest his daughter in case she showed up due to arrest warrants but to avail she never showed up. Also he became a grandfather who had one grandson who later committed suicide due to a career criminal doing child abuse but the grandfather and his previous issues as Mayor led to no arrest and was closed under mysterious circumstances from a higher up state official.

References

External links
 City of Cumberland, Maryland

1928 births
2003 deaths
People from Buffalo, New York
Yale University alumni
Mayors of Cumberland, Maryland
Maryland Democrats
Businesspeople from Cumberland, Maryland